The statue of Benjamin Disraeli is an outdoor bronze sculpture by Mario Raggi, located at the west side of Parliament Square in London.  It was unveiled in 1883 and became a Grade II listed building in 1970.

Description and history 
 

The memorial features a bronze statue of the former prime minister Benjamin Disraeli, dressed in his robes as 1st Earl of Beaconsfield, standing on a red granite pedestal.  At the front, immediately below the statue, the pedestal bears the inscription "BEACONSFIELD", and the rear face has the inscription "BENJAMIN DISRAELI / EARL OF BEACONSFIELD / K.G. / 1804 – 1881".

The statue was made by Mario Raggi (sometimes known as Mario Razzi or Rossi) and cast by H. Young & Co, art founders of Pimlico.  It was recognised as a good likeness, based on a bust that Raggi had made before Disraeli's death.  The monument was unveiled by Sir Stafford Northcote, Disraeli's successor as leader of the Conservative Party, on the second anniversary of Disraeli's death, 19 April 1883, a date which became known as Primrose Day.  For many years, into the 1920s, arrangements of primroses, reputedly Disraeli's favourite flower, were left at the memorial to commemorate the anniversary of his death.  

Originally sited on the south side of the square facing south towards St Margaret's, Westminster, it was moved when the square was reconfigured in the 1950s, and resited in its present location, on the west side of the square facing east towards the Houses of Parliament. The statue became a Grade II listed building in 1970.

Notes

References
 STATUE OF BENJAMIN DISRAELI, EARL OF BEACONSFIELD, Non Civil Parish - 126370 | Historic England 
 Disraeli statue, londonremembers.com

External links
 

1883 establishments in the United Kingdom
1883 sculptures
Benjamin Disraeli
Bronze sculptures in the United Kingdom
Disraeli, Benjamin
Parliament Square
Disraeli, Benjamin
Disraeli, Benjamin
Disraeli